John MacDonald Badham (born August 25, 1939) is an English-American television and film director, best known for his films Saturday Night Fever (1977), Dracula (1979), Blue Thunder (1983), WarGames (1983), Short Circuit (1986), and Stakeout (1987).

Early life
Badham was born in Luton, Bedfordshire, England, the son of U.S. Army General Henry Lee Badham Jr., and English-born actress Mary Iola Badham (née Hewitt). Henry, a native of Birmingham, Alabama, moved his family back to the US when John was two years old. John's parents and paternal grandparents are buried in Elmwood Cemetery in Birmingham. Henry was an aviator in both World Wars, and was posthumously inducted into the Alabama Aviation Hall of Fame in 2007. After retirement from the U.S. Air Force as a brigadier general, Henry became a businessman and helped develop the Ensley and Bessemer regions near Birmingham. This same line of business had brought his own father, John's grandfather, into association with Walker Percy, grandfather of writer Walker Percy.

After World War II, Badham's family settled in Mountain Brook, an affluent suburb of Birmingham. He attended Indian Springs School, at that time a brand-new, liberal boys' school located a short distance south of Birmingham in Shelby County near the rural post office of Helena. He later went to college at Yale University.

Career
Badham worked in television for years, before his breakthrough in 1977 with Saturday Night Fever, a massive worldwide hit starring John Travolta. WarGames (1983), starring Matthew Broderick, is his other signature film, renowned for its take on popular Cold War fears of nuclear terror as well as being one of the first films to deal with the subculture of amateur hacking.

In addition to his numerous film credits, Badham has also directed and produced for TV, including credits for Rod Serling's Night Gallery, and the A&E television series The Beast. He has also contributed commentary to the web series Trailers from Hell.

In 1986, he signed a two-year development deal with production company Universal Pictures, in order to develop various film projects.

Unrealized projects
Badham has been considered to direct films that ended up being helmed by other directors, such as The Wiz (1978), Brubaker (1980), First Blood (1982), Staying Alive (1983), The Dead Zone (1983), Starman (1984), Project X (1987), Short Circuit 2 (1988), Ghost Dad (1990), Patriot Games (1992), The Firm (1993), and Dragonheart (1996).

Family
Badham's sister, Mary Badham, was nominated for an Oscar for her role as "Scout" Finch in the film To Kill a Mockingbird. They worked together on one project, William Castle's Let's Kill Uncle, released in 1966; Badham was Castle's casting director, and Mary played one of the leads.

Badham's former wife is retired model Jan Speck of The New Treasure Hunt. She had assorted cameo roles in many of his projects, starting in the 1980s.

Filmography 
The Bingo Long Traveling All-Stars & Motor Kings (1976)
Saturday Night Fever (1977)
Dracula (1979)
Whose Life Is It Anyway? (1981)
Blue Thunder (1983)
WarGames (1983)
American Flyers (1985)
Short Circuit (1986)
Stakeout (1987)
Bird on a Wire (1990)
The Hard Way (1991)
Point of No Return (1993)
Another Stakeout (1993)
Drop Zone (1994)
Nick of Time (1995)
Incognito (1997)

Television films
The Impatient Heart, NBC (1971)
No Place to Run, ABC (1972) (uncredited)
Isn't It Shocking?, ABC (1973)
The Law, NBC (1974)
The Gun, ABC (1974)
Reflections of Murder, ABC (1974)
The Godchild, ABC (1974)
The Keegans, CBS (1976)
Floating Away, Showtime (1998)
The Jack Bull, HBO (1999)
The Last Debate, Showtime (2000)
Brother's Keeper, USA (2002)
Obsessed, Lifetime (2002)
Footsteps, CBS (2003)
Evel Knievel, TNT (2004)

Television series
The Bold Ones: The Senator, NBC, (1971)
Sarge, NBC, (1971)
Night Gallery, NBC, (1971)
Nichols, NBC, (1972)
The Sixth Sense, ABC, (1972)
The Bold Ones: The New Doctors, NBC, (1972)
Cool Million, NBC, (1972)
Owen Marshall: Counselor at Law, ABC, (1973)
The Streets of San Francisco, ABC, (1973)
Cannon, CBS, (1973)
Kung Fu, ABC, (1973)
Police Story, NBC, (1973)
Rex Harrison Presents Stories of Love, NBC, (1974)
The Shield, FX, (2003)
Blind Justice, ABC, (2005)
Just Legal, The WB, (2005)
Heroes, NBC, (2006)
Crossing Jordan, NBC, (2007)
Standoff, FOX, (2007)
Las Vegas, NBC, (2007)
Psych, USA, (2007)
Men in Trees, ABC, (2008)
In Plain Sight, USA, (2008)
The Beast, A&E, (2009)
Criminal Minds, CBS, (2009)
Trauma, NBC, (2010)
The Event, NBC, (2010)
Nikita, The CW, (2012)
Constantine, NBC, (2014)
Supernatural, The CW, (2014)
12 Monkeys, SYFY, (2015)
Stitchers, FREE, (2015)
Arrow, The CW, (2015)
Rush Hour, CBS, (2016)
Siren, Freeform, (2018)

Publications

References

External links 
 
 
 

1939 births
Living people
English film directors
English television directors
English film producers
English television producers
English screenwriters
English male film actors
English male television actors
English male voice actors
English male video game actors
English emigrants to the United States
Artists from Birmingham, Alabama
People from Luton
Yale University alumni
Indian Springs School alumni
People from Mountain Brook, Alabama
Film directors from Alabama